Janne Petteri Ahonen (born 11 May 1977) is a Finnish former ski jumper and drag racer. He competed in ski jumping between 1992 and 2018, and is one of the sport's most successful athletes of all time, as well as one of the most successful from Finland. Ahonen won two consecutive World Cup overall titles (the most recent ski jumper to do so, as of 2022), the Four Hills Tournament a record five times, two individual gold medals at the World Championships, and the Nordic Tournament once. Nicknamed Kuningaskotka ("King Eagle"), he has been described as the greatest ski jumper to have never won an individual medal at the Winter Olympics.

Career 
Ahonen's most notable achievements include five World Championships (normal hill in 1997; large hill in 2005; team large hill in 1995, 1997 and 2003), two World Cup overall titles (2003/04 and 2004/05) and a record-breaking five victories in the Four Hills Tournament (1998/99, 2002/03, 2004/05, 2005/06 and 2007/08). He is the all-time leader in World Cup points, podiums (133) and top 10 appearances (245). With 36 World Cup victories, Ahonen has the fourth-most behind Gregor Schlierenzauer, Matti Nykänen and Adam Małysz. In 2005, Ahonen was named the Finnish Sports Personality of the Year.

Over the course of nine World Ski Jumping Championships, nine Ski Flying World Championships and seven Winter Olympics, Ahonen has won a total of 19 medals, equalling the medal count of Matti Nykänen–although most of Ahonen's are in team, rather than individual events. Despite his successes, Ahonen has never won an individual Olympic medal, placing fourth three times. In Olympic team competitions, he has won two silver medals. His seven Olympic Games rank him second in terms of number of Olympic participations among ski jumpers, behind Noriaki Kasai.

Ahonen announced his retirement from ski jumping on 28 March 2008, with a farewell competition held in Lahti on 9 July 2008. After a season's absence, he returned for two more seasons in 2009/10 and 2010/11. The best achievement of his revived career was a second place in the 2009/10 Four Hills Tournament.

During his ski jumping career, Ahonen has been known for his apparent lack of emotion and is rarely seen smiling even on the podium. When asked for a reason, he responded with "We came here to jump and not to smile." In Finnish interviews Ahonen often made sarcastic comments with dry humour. The German press nicknamed Ahonen "Der Mann mit der Maske" ("The Man with the Mask"), in reference to the distinctive plastic masks he wore in competitions from 1996 until 2002. In Finland, Ahonen is often called "Kuningaskotka" ("King Eagle").

On 10 January 2013, Ahonen announced that he would come out of retirement for a second time, with the aim of winning a medal in an individual event at the 2014 Winter Olympics in Sochi. He went on to finish 29th on the normal hill and 22nd on the large hill. Ahonen also was a member of the Finnish ski jumping team at the 2018 Winter Olympics in PyeongChang, South Korea, where he placed 27th and 40th in the individual competitions and was part of the Finnish team that finished eighth in the team competition.

In October 2018 Ahonen announced his retirement from competitive jumping for a third time, stating "I will never quit ski jumping – I will continue to jump when I feel like it – but I can confirm that I will not take part in any competitions anymore".

Olympic games

Standings

World Cup

Standings

Wins

Drag racing
Ahonen competes with his Ahonen Racing Team - ART in drag racing, winning the Finnish and Nordic Championships. His best performance in Top Fuel is 4.044 sec. 476.19 km/h in 2012.

Personal life
Ahonen is married to Tiia Ahonen, with whom he has two sons born in 2001 and 2008.

References

External links

1977 births
Living people
Sportspeople from Lahti
Finnish male ski jumpers
Finnish racing drivers
Olympic silver medalists for Finland
Olympic ski jumpers of Finland
Ski jumpers at the 1994 Winter Olympics
Ski jumpers at the 1998 Winter Olympics
Ski jumpers at the 2002 Winter Olympics
Ski jumpers at the 2006 Winter Olympics
Ski jumpers at the 2010 Winter Olympics
Ski jumpers at the 2014 Winter Olympics
Ski jumpers at the 2018 Winter Olympics
Dragster drivers
Olympic medalists in ski jumping
FIS Nordic World Ski Championships medalists in ski jumping
Holmenkollen medalists
Medalists at the 2006 Winter Olympics
Medalists at the 2002 Winter Olympics